Kenneth Neal Jennings (8 November 1930 - 14 December 2007)  was Dean of Gloucester from 1983 until 1996.

Jennings was educated at Hertford Grammar School, Corpus Christi College, Cambridge and Ripon College Cuddesdon. After a curacy at Holy Trinity, Ramsgate he joined the staff of Bishop’s College, Calcutta. Later he was Vice Principal of his old theological college from (1967 to 1973) then Vicar of Hitchin, a post he held until his appointment to the Deanery.

Notes

1930 births
People educated at Hertford Grammar School
Alumni of Corpus Christi College, Cambridge
Alumni of Ripon College Cuddesdon
Deans of Gloucester
2007 deaths